Vaucluse Bay Range Front Light is an active lighthouse located on the east side of the entrance to Vaucluse Bay in Vaucluse, New South Wales, Australia. It serves as the front range light (Vaucluse Bay Range Rear Light serving as the rear light) into Vaucluse Bay.

It is one of four lighthouses designed in a style sometimes called "Disney Castle", the others being Grotto Point Light, Parriwi Head Light and Vaucluse Bay Range Rear Light.

The light is shone through a window.

Site operation and visiting 
The light is operated by the Sydney Ports Corporation. It is located on private land and not accessible to the public. Viewing the lighthouse from the street (80 Wentworth Road) is very difficult due to the steep terrain so the lighthouse is best viewed from the water.

See also 

 List of lighthouses in Australia

References

External links 
 
 

Lighthouses completed in 1910
Lighthouses in Sydney
1910 establishments in Australia